Sabelo J. Ndlovu-Gatsheni (born 6 June 1968) is a Professor and Chair of Epistemologies of the Global South at the University of Bayreuth, Germany.

Biography

Sabelo J. Ndlovu-Gatsheni was educated at the University of Zimbabwe, in Harare, and University of Witwatersrand in South Africa. he holds a BA Honours degree in History, MA in African History, PhD in History and PGDE in Education.

He previously worked as Professor of History at the University of Zimbabwe and Professor of History and Development Studies at Midlands State University, located in the city of Gweru, Zimbabwe; Research Professor at the University of South Africa (UNISA), South Africa; Professor Extraordinarius at the University of the Free State (UFS) in South Africa; Honorary Professor at the University of KwaZulu-Natal (UKZN) in South Africa; Visiting Research Fellow at the University of Johannesburg in South Africa; and is also a Research Associate of The Ferguson Centre for African and Asian Studies at The Open University in the United Kingdom.

Works
 Epistemic Freedom in Africa: Deprovincialization and Decolonization
 Empire, Global Coloniality and African Subjectivity
 The Decolonial Mandela: Peace, Justice and the Politics of Life
 Coloniality of Power in Postcolonial Africa: Myths of Decolonization

References

External links
 Google scholar page

1968 births
Living people
Academic staff of the University of Bayreuth
Zimbabwean philosophers